Brigadier-General The Honourable Charles Granville Bruce, CB, MVO (7 April 1866 – 12 July 1939) was a veteran  Himalayan mountaineer and leader of the second and third British expeditions to Mount Everest in 1922 and 1924. In recognition of the former he was awarded a special prize at the conclusion of the first ever Winter Olympics.

Background and early life
Charles Granville Bruce was the youngest of the fourteen children of Henry Bruce, 1st Baron Aberdare (1815–1895) and Norah Napier (1827–1897). His father was born at Duffryn, Aberdare, attended Swansea Grammar School, and trained as a barrister. In the 1830s, coal was discovered beneath the family's land, and with the development of the industry they became rich. Henry Bruce was stipendiary magistrate for Merthyr Tydfil, 1847 to 1854, Liberal member of parliament for Merthyr Tydfil, 1852 to 1869, and Home Secretary in Gladstone's government, 1868 to 1873. He was created first Baron Aberdare, of Duffryn, in 1873.   His mother was youngest daughter of General Sir William Francis Patrick Napier.

Bruce was educated at Harrow and Repton. His early life alternated between the 'pompous formality' of Queen's Gate, London, the family home in Aberdare, and a Scottish estate.

In Wales, his mentor was a local farmer and inn-keeper, who in his youth had worked as a hunter in California and British Columbia. He taught the young Bruce how to hunt, find his way around the local hills, and drink. One of Bruce's most notable achievements was running down a "rough crew" of local poachers. Half a century later he was proud to list their names in his memoirs; "Bill the Butcher, Shoni Kick-O-Top, Billie Blaen Llechau, Dick Shon Edwards & Dai Brass-Knocker".
Bruce and the local game-keepers chased one poacher to the narrow alleyways and courts of Georgetown. The poacher was only caught when a furious husband found him snoring in his wife's bed and threw him out on the street. The gang were duly punished, but gained revenge by returning to Bruce's house and stealing all the weapons from his father's gun-room.

After leaving school, Bruce entered military college. He had huge physical strength, was an enthusiastic boxer and 300-yard runner, and in the 1880s represented England against France in an international running meeting.

In 1894 he married Finetta Madelina Julia Campbell, daughter of Sir Edward Campbell, 2nd Baronet

Career
In 1888, Bruce joined the Indian Army and became a career soldier serving with the 5th Gurkha Rifles from 1889 to 1920, rising to the rank of Brigadier-General. As a young lieutenant he was posted to Abbotabad, a British hill station in the Panjab, where he developed a passion for the locality, wrestling and climbing. Bruce had an akhara (wrestling pit) dug near his residence, where he practised on most days. Both the British and the Rajahs wagered thousands of rupees on professional wrestling matches and took pride in having the strongest sides. In the 1910s, Bruce was patron of the wrestler Rahim Sulaniwala, who went on to become a renowned champion (Summers 2000).

Bruce took a special interest in his Gurkha soldiers and became fluent in Nepali. He introduced hill racing to his Gurkha regiment and in 1891 took his champion runner Pabir Thapa to Zermatt, in Switzerland, to learn ice-climbing. On the way there, the two stayed at Aberdare, where Thapa enjoyed "running down" poachers. Despite his poor English, he was very popular with the locals. He disappeared for the last three days of his visit and was found living it up with some coal miners in Tonypandy. Bruce went on to train the Gurkhas in mountain-warfare. In 1897 he equipped his troops on the Northern Frontier with shorts, and is widely credited with their introduction to the British Army.

Bruce's climbing experience was impressive. He spent ten climbing seasons in the European Alps and took part in three of the earliest climbing expeditions to the Himalaya. In 1892, with a troop of Gurkha soldiers he accompanied Conway in his exploration of the Baltoro region of the Karakorum, visiting Muztagh Tower, Broad Peak and K2. In 1893 he was with Francis Younghusband on a mission to the Hindu Kush to bestow recognition on Nizam-uk-Mulk as Mehtar. He and Younghusband were probably the first to discuss mounting an expedition to climb Everest. In Himalayan Wanderer, Bruce says that it was Younghusband's idea. Younghusband says that it was Bruce's. In 1895, Bruce joined Albert F. Mummery and Collie in their attempt on Nanga Parbat, but he had to leave early because his army leave was up. In 1906–1907, he and Longstaff took another troop of Gurkhas to the Nanda Devi group, visiting Dunagiri and Kanchenjunga, and climbing Trisul.

In 1915, Bruce went to Gallipoli, in command of the 1st Battalion the 6th Gurkha Rifles. After two months in the front line he was severely wounded and was transferred back to India.
He had perpetual good humour, enthusiasm, and love of alcohol, coupled with competence and shrewdness. He was a superb raconteur, and a fount of bawdy stories. Younghusband described him as "an extraordinary mixture of man and boy..... you never know which of them you are talking to".

Between 1923 and 1925 Bruce was president of the Alpine Club. Because of his experience in the Himalaya he was appointed leader of the 1922 British Mount Everest Expedition, the first attempt to summit Everest. He was skilful in bridging the cultural divide between Sahib and Sherpa, and had long advocated training Indians in mountain techniques, with a view to forming a body of porters and guides like those in the European Alps. He called his men porters rather than coolies. He was particularly liked by the local peoples, and for the 1922 expedition collected a cohort of local men, and enthused them with an esprit de corps. He later christened an elite group of high altitude porters the "Tigers". He was universally admired by the expedition team; George Mallory in particular, liked and trusted him. Bruce was wary of oxygen apparatus, nevertheless, George Finch and Geoffrey Bruce (Charles's cousin) used oxygen to set a new altitude record of 27,300 feet on Everest, via the North Col.

Bruce was appointed leader of the next effort to summit Everest, the 1924 British Mount Everest expedition. Several stories of him survive the trip. On the trek to Tibet, two of his muleteers got drunk and bit a local Tibetan woman. As punishment he fined them, and made them carry the  "treasury" (double the normal load carried) on a three-day march. Arthur Hinks, the rather mean-spirited secretary of the expedition committee seated in London, was exasperated by the official correspondence reaching London from the Himalayas.

Bruce contracted malaria while tiger shooting in India before the expedition, and had to be stretchered out of Tibet. Two days later Mallory and Andrew Irvine disappeared on their summit attempt, and it is still argued  that they may have succeeded in completing Bruce's goal of having an expedition member reach the summit.

Bruce did not return to Everest. Between 1931 and 1936 he was Honorary Colonel of the 5th Royal Gurkha Rifles of the Indian Army. He died of a stroke in 1939.

Expeditions

 1892: Karakoram, with William Martin Conway
 1895: Nanga Parbat, with Albert F. Mummery
 1907: Trisul, with Tom George Longstaff
 1922: 1922 British Mount Everest expedition, with Edward Lisle Strutt
 1924: 1924 British Mount Everest expedition

Works by Bruce
 Twenty Years in the Himalaya. London: Edward Arnold, 1910
 Kulu and Lahoul. An account of my latest climbing journeys in the Himalaya. London: Edward Arnold, 1914
 The Assault on Mount Everest 1922. London: Longmans, Green & Co, 1922
 Himalayan Wanderer. London: Alexander Maclehose & Co, 1934

See also
 Timeline of climbing Mount Everest

References

 Summers, J., Fearless on Everest (Weidenfeld & Nicolson, 2000)
 Younghusband, F., The Epic of Mount Everest (London: Arnold, 1926)

External links

 
 
 Kenneth Mason, 'Bruce, Charles Granville (1866–1939)’, rev. Peter H. Hansen, Oxford Dictionary of National Biography, Oxford University Press, 2004
 The Peerage of Britain: Charles Granville Bruce
 

1866 births
1939 deaths
Military personnel from London
English explorers
English mountain climbers
Companions of the Order of the Bath
Members of the Royal Victorian Order
People educated at Harrow School
People educated at Bishop Gore School
People educated at Repton School
Presidents of the Alpine Club (UK)
British Indian Army generals
Indian Army personnel of World War I
Younger sons of barons